Siah Khani or Siahkhani may refer to:
 Siah Khani, Gilan
 Siah Khani, Ilam
 Siahkhani, Kermanshah